Bagnell is a city in Miller County, Missouri, United States. The population was 93 at the 2010 census.

History
Bagnell was platted in 1882, when the railroad was extended through the area. The city was named after William Bagnell of St. Louis County, who operated a tie business along the Osage River. A post office called Bagnell was established in 1884, and remained in operation until 1942.

Geography
Bagnell is located at  (38.229284, -92.605967).

Demographics

2010 census
At the 2010 census there were 93 people in 43 households, including 24 families, in the city. The racial makeup of the city was 94.6% White and 5.4% from two or more races.

Of the 43 households, 32.6% had children under the age of 18 living with them, 34.9% were married couples living together, 16.3% had a female householder with no husband present, 4.7% had a male householder with no wife present, and 44.2% were non-families. 32.6% of households were one person, and 4.6% were one person aged 65 or older. The average household size was 2.16 and the average family size was 2.71.

The median age was 42.3 years. 23.7% of residents were under the age of 18; 8.6% were between the ages of 18 and 24; 27% were from 25 to 44; 34.4% were from 45 to 64; and 6.5% were 65 or older. The gender makeup of the city was 49.5% male and 50.5% female.

2000 census
At the 2000 census there were 86 people, 36 households, and 20 families in the town. The population density was 183.3 people per square mile (70.6/km2). There were 37 housing units at an average density of 78.9 per square mile (30.4/km2).  The racial makeup of the town was 96.51% White and 3.49% Native American. Hispanic or Latino of any race were 1.16%.

Of the 36 households, 30.6% had children under the age of 18 living with them, 38.9% were married couples living together, 11.1% had a female householder with no husband present, and 41.7% were non-families. 38.9% of households were one person, and 22.2% were one person aged 65 or older. The average household size was 2.39 and the average family size was 3.00.

In the town the population was spread out, with 27.9% under the age of 18, 9.3% from 18 to 24, 29.1% from 25 to 44, 20.9% from 45 to 64, and 12.8% 65 or older. The median age was 36 years. For every 100 females there were 95.5 males. For every 100 females age 18 and over, there were 100.0 males.

The median household income was $25,313 and the median family income  was $27,857. Males had a median income of $22,083 versus $16,563 for females. The per capita income for the town was $14,633. There were no families and 2.2% of the population living below the poverty line, including no under eighteens and 11.1% of those over 64.

References

Cities in Miller County, Missouri
Cities in Missouri